Ruth E. Foster (January 29, 1920 – May 12, 2012) was an American actress who portrayed Walnut Grove's post-mistress, also named Foster, for several seasons on the NBC TV series Little House on the Prairie (1974–1983).

Life and career
Foster was born on January 29, 1920, in Cincinnati, Ohio, as Ruth Emma Foerstel, the first child of George and Helen Wilhelmy Foerstel. She first broke into show business at the age of 12 when the Shubert Theater sponsored a Fred Astaire and Ginger Rogers dance contest. Foster competed and won first place. This exposure lead to a job as a dancer with a traveling dance group. Soon, she was offered a job as a dancer for the Latin Quarter Show. After several years of dancing, Foster went on to become an actress.

She traveled with vaudeville dance troupes in the early 1930s. Foster was on Ben Casey as Miss Fleming from 1962 to 1964. She was in Dimension 5 and Cyborg 2087 that were going to be released on television as television films, instead were theatrically released across the United States. Foster is most remembered as Melinda Foster, the Post office manager, on Little House on the Prairie for 61 episodes from 1974 to 1983. She was also a film editor, video tape editor and an associate producer. In 1984, Foster reprised her role as Melinda Foster in the Made-for-TV-Movies Little House: Bless All the Dear Children and Little House: The Last Farewell. Foster danced professionally in the Palm Springs and Branson Follies until the age of 85.

Personal life and death 
Foster married comedian Bobby Pinkus, a.k.a. Peter J. Accardy, in 1939. Accardy died on September 16, 1986.  Foster died of natural causes in Del Mar, California at the age of 92.  Several Little House cast-mates attended her funeral services.

Filmography

Acting

Film

Television

Producing

Television

Editing

Documentaries

Film

Television

References

Sources

External links

Ruth Foster R. I. P.

1920 births
2012 deaths
American television actresses
Burials at Forest Lawn Memorial Park (Hollywood Hills)
21st-century American women